Gardenia gummifera is a species of plant in the family Rubiaceae. It is endemic to India.

References

Endemic flora of India (region)
gummifera
Least concern plants
Taxonomy articles created by Polbot